Uvs Lake (pinyin: Wū Bù Sū hú) is a highly saline lake in an endorheic basin—Uvs Nuur Basin in Mongolia with a small part in Russia. It is the largest lake in Mongolia by surface area, covering 3,350 km2 at 759 m above sea level. 
The northeastern tip of the lake is situated in the Tuva Republic of the Russian Federation. The largest settlement near the lake is Ulaangom. This shallow and very saline body of water is a remainder of a huge saline sea which covered a much larger area several thousand years ago.

Name 
The name Uvs Nuur (sometimes spelled Ubsa Nor or Ubsunur) derives from subsen, a Turkic/Mongolian word referring to the bitter dregs left behind in the making of airag (Mongolian milk wine), and nuur, the Mongolian word for lake. The name is a reference to the lake's salty, undrinkable water. In one Mongolian folk tale a character named Sartaktai, known for digging wondrous canals and setting courses for rivers, tries to connect Uvs lake to another nearby lake by digging a canal between them. But when the water of Uvs lake refuses to flow, Sartaktai angrily declares "Be thy name Subsennor!" A name that is defined as "bad wine, dregs of the spirit that comes from the still..."

Geography 

Uvs Lake has a length of 84 km and a width of 79 km, with an average depth of 6 m. Its basin is separated from the rest of the Great Lakes Depression by the Khan Khökhii ridge; however, it is not a rift lake as some mistakenly think.

The main feeding rivers are the Baruunturuun, Nariin gol, and Tes (primary feed of the lake) from Khangai Mountains in the east, and the Kharkhiraa River and Sangil gol from the Altai Mountains in the west.

Ecology 
The very large catchment area with no exit results in highly saline water, primarily due to sulphate and sodium ions. It has a salinity of 18.8 ppt, or 1.88%, making it half as salty as the oceans.

The lake freezes over from October to May. In summer, it exhibits a temperature gradient from 25 °C at the surface to 19 °C at the bottom.

29 different species of fish are known from Uvs Lake, and one of them, the Potanini altai osman (Oreoleuciscus potanini),
is suitable for human consumption.

Protected sites 

All of the lake and many parts of its surroundings have been declared protected sites. The UNESCO is using the designation "Uvs Lake site" as an umbrella term to summarize twelve separate clusters of protected sites, each a representative of a  major eastern Eurasian biome.

Lake Uvs Basin 

The Uvs Lake is the terminal basin for the Uvs Lake Basin, which covers an area of 70,000 km2 and represents one of the best-preserved natural steppe landscapes of Eurasia. The border between Mongolia and Russia runs through the northern periphery of the basin. Here the world's most northern desert meets the world's most southern  tundra zone. Apart from the Uvs Lake, the basin comprises several smaller lakes. As these lakes lie to the north of other inland seas of Central Asia, they are of key importance for waterfowl migration. 

Since the basin spans the geoclimatic boundary between Siberia and Central Asia, temperatures may vary from −58 °C in winter to 47 °C in summer. Despite its harsh climate, the depression is home to 173 bird species and 41 mammal species, including the globally endangered snow leopard, argali, and Asiatic ibex. The population density is low here. The lack of industry and the  reliance of the inhabitants on traditional ways such as nomadic pasturing have little impact on the landscape and allow the ecosystem to remain relatively pristine.

In 2003, the UNESCO listed the Uvs Lake Basin as a natural World Heritage Site. It was nominated as "one of the largest intact watersheds in Central Asia where 40,000 archeological sites can be found from historically famous nomadic tribes such as the Scythians, the Turks and the Huns." This transboundary patrimony is one of the largest sites inscribed in the World Heritage List to date.

References

External links

UNESCO evaluation of the property
Data summary Uvs Nuur
Protected areas of the world Uvs Nuur Basin, Russian Federation (Tuva) & Mongolia
 Natural Heritage Protection Fund - The Uvs Nuur Basin
 Notes on the Cladoceran and Copepod Fauna of the Uvs Nuur Basin (Northwest Mongolia)
Uvs Lake, Mongolia
The Ubsunur Hollow State Biosphere Reserve
Ubsu-Nur Accepted into World Network of Biosphere Reserves
Singing Stones - The Republic of Tuva
Ubsu Nur satellite photo
The distribution of the vegetation in the Uvs-nuur basin and its surrounding mountain ranges
Lake Uvs and its surrounding wetlands
Limnological Catalog of Mongolian Lakes

Lakes of Mongolia
Lakes of Tuva
Mongolia–Russia border
International lakes of Asia
World Heritage Sites in Russia
World Heritage Sites in Mongolia
Saline lakes of Asia
Ramsar sites in Mongolia
Endorheic lakes of Asia